Coolidge Corner is a neighborhood of Brookline, Massachusetts, centered on the intersection of Beacon Street and Harvard Street.  The neighborhood takes its name from the Coolidge & Brother general store that opened in 1857 at that intersection at the site of today's S.S. Pierce building, which was for many years the only commercial business in north Brookline.

Culture
Coolidge Corner developed as a transit-oriented streetcar suburb, and retains a pedestrian-friendly, walking around feel.  Many popular coffee shops, pharmacies, small independent boutiques, an independent bookstore, and independent restaurants are located there, as well as a few retail chain stores. In recent years, an influx of national bank chains has taken over several prime storefronts, detracting from the traditional neighborhood retail mix. There is a growing community backlash against this trend.

The neighborhood has a significant Jewish population, and there are large synagogues located on both Beacon and Harvard streets. The northern portion of Harvard Street, near the border with the Boston neighborhood of Allston, is characterized by a cluster of Jewish-oriented shops, including a bookstore, giftshop, kosher butcher, and various other stores and eateries.

Sites
Near Coolidge Corner, at 83 Beals Street, is the birthplace of President John F. Kennedy. It is a National Historic Site operated by the National Park Service.
Coolidge Corner is also home of the Coolidge Corner Theatre, a restored Art Deco movie palace that has been showing movies since 1933. It is a not-for-profit arts institution, featuring first run arthouse films, including independent films, international cinema, and documentaries. It is one of the last remaining original big screen movie houses in the country. The main theatre has a recessed theatrical stage, and seats 700 with classic elegance and cinematic style.
The S.S. Pierce Building, constructed in 1897, and originally an S.S. Pierce grocery store, is a historically significant Tudor-style building.  It has accommodated a number of businesses over the years (it housed a Walgreens until June 2015, in addition to several offices on the second floor), and is recognized by its large clock tower, visible from nearly all points in Coolidge Corner. (The original tower was damaged in a storm in 1944 and replaced by the current tower.)
The Brookline Booksmith is a major independent bookstore in Coolidge Corner. It hosts author readings several times a week. It also sells used books in the basement, where most author readings are held.
Coolidge Corner contains several restaurants, including a crêperie, two falafel joints, and several Asian food restaurants. Many different events, including author readings, family game nights and seasonal sidewalks sales, are regularly hosted by members of the Coolidge Corner Merchants' Association.
Coolidge Corner also hosts a popular weekly farmer's market on Thursdays from June through November.

Public transportation
.

Light rail and subway
Coolidge Corner is served by the Coolidge Corner station of the MBTA's Green Line C branch that runs in a reserved central median along Beacon Street beginning at the St. Mary's Street stop west of Kenmore Square.

Bus
The #66 MBTA crosstown bus route runs through Coolidge Corner along Harvard Street on its way from Dudley to Harvard Square. The route is considered one of the MBTA's 15 key bus routes that have high ridership and higher frequency standards than other bus lines.

Education

Public schools
Coolidge Corner is home to a K-8 public elementary school, the Edward Devotion School. In 2018, Brookline's Town Meeting approved a warrant article to rename the school. The new name was decided by a community wide process. The school was formerly known as the Coolidge Corner School. In November 2019, members of the town voted to change the name to Florida Ruffin Ridley school. The name change took effect in September 2020.

References

1857 establishments in Massachusetts
Brookline, Massachusetts
Neighborhoods in Massachusetts
Populated places established in 1857
Populated places in Norfolk County, Massachusetts
Streetcar suburbs